Domenico Genovese (born 2 February 1961) is an English former professional footballer and manager.

Playing career

Genovese began his career with spells at several non-league sides including two spells with Boston United and one with Kettering Town. After a successful trial with Manchester United, he his home town club Peterborough United in 1987, making his debut during a 2–1 victory over Exeter City at London Road. He left the club a year later having made sixteen league appearances, his last appearance for the Posh coming in a 2–0 win over Doncaster Rovers.

After leaving Peterborough, Genovese signed moved into Non-League football, playing for Wisbech Town, Holbeach United, as well as moving to Sweden, playing for Grebbestads IF.

Managerial career

He ended his playing career and became a ""Football in the Community officer"" for then Southern League Premier Division side Kettering Town. In 2003, he took over as caretaker-manager of the Poppies, with the mission of keeping the side in the Conference National following their struggle upon their return, Genovese failed this and as the town of Kettering was the nearest to the town of Aldershot, the club were put in the Isthmian League to replace the "Shots" Despite this, Genovese was offered the position on a permanent basis, and his first match in charge saw his Kettering side beat Northwood 2–1.

Following a bad run of results, which saw them bowl out of the cup at the last qualifying round of the FA Cup to lower grade Boreham Wood which denied them a place in the first round proper, Genovese left and was later succeeded by Kevin Wilson.

In 2007, Genovese was appointed Director of Football of Spalding United, and later spent a short time as caretaker-manager following the departure of Phil Hubbard.

He is currently a Director of "Soccer Star" which is a football academy for Kids.

References

http://www.poppiesfans.com/history/managers/dominic-genovese.php

1961 births
Living people
Sportspeople from Peterborough
English people of Italian descent
English footballers
English football managers
Stamford A.F.C. players
Peterborough United F.C. players
Boston United F.C. players
Cambridge City F.C. players
Nuneaton Borough F.C. players
Grantham Town F.C. players
Wisbech Town F.C. players
Holbeach United F.C. players
English Football League players
Kettering Town F.C. managers
Spalding United F.C. managers
Association football forwards
English expatriate sportspeople in Sweden
Expatriate footballers in Sweden